Juramentado, in Philippine history, refers to a male Moro swordsman (from the Tausug tribe of Sulu) who attacked and killed targeted occupying and invading police and soldiers, expecting to be killed himself, the martyrdom undertaken as a form of jihad, considered a form of suicide attack. Unlike an amok, who commits acts of random violence against Muslims and non-Muslims alike, a juramentado was a dedicated, premeditated, and sometimes highly skilled killer who prepared himself through a ritual of binding, shaving, and prayer in order to accomplish brazen attacks armed only with edged weapons.

For generations warlike Moro tribes had successfully prevented Spain from fully controlling the areas around Mindanao and the Sulu Archipelago, developing a well-earned reputation as notorious seafaring raiders, adept naval tacticians, and ferocious warriors who frequently demonstrated extraordinary personal bravery in combat. While Moro forces could never match opponents' firepower or armor, such bands used intelligence, audacity and mobility to raid strongly defended targets and quickly defeat more vulnerable ones. One extreme asymmetric warfare tactic was the Moro juramentado.

Etymology and usage
Juramentado is an archaic term derived from the Spanish word juramentar, meaning one who takes an oath.  Some sources link amoks (from the Malayan term for "out of control") and juramentados as similar culture-specific syndromes while others draw distinctions of religious preparation and state of mind. A Moro might be said to have "gone juramentado" or be "running juramentado."

U.S. Army officers who had served in Moroland incorporated the idiom into their own vocabulary, but often simply equated it with the Moro people as a whole. In his memoirs, Army Air Service advocate Benjamin D. Foulois said of volatile rival Army Air Service officer Billy Mitchell, "He had become fanatic much in the way that the Moros were in the Philippines. He had become a juramentado and was ready to run amok."

History

The term juramentado was coined by José Malcampo, in command during the Spanish occupation of Jolo Island in 1876, but Moros had been making such personal attacks for many years. By the time of the Spanish–American War juramentados were being discussed in the American media, some official sources finding few documented cases. By 1903, local United States Army commander Leonard Wood sent a report to Governor of the Philippines William Howard Taft indicating juramentados were "an oft repeated offense." Almost forty years later, on the eve of the Japanese invasion of the Philippine Islands beginning the Second World War, Time Magazine was reporting juramentado attacks in Jolo occurring "once every other day".

The Moro juramentados performed suicide attacks against Japanese troops. The Japanese were among several enemies the Moros juramentados launched suicide attacks against, the others being the Spanish, Americans and Filipinos. 

The reason for the less usable .38 Long Colt being phased out and replaced by the .45 Colt as well as the very invention of the words for the concept "stopping power" were due to Moro juramentados.
New research is indicating that while this has been popularly repeated for decades, this is simply a myth passed down that started as anywhere from telephone effect in storytelling, hearsay in oral history all the way to propaganda for the "big bore" faction of handgun requisition for the army, as a mandate for army requisition being restricted to handguns of .45 caliber or larger only had gone into effect in peacetime- years before the Spanish American War, and consequential American involvement in the Moro Insurrection, could have been a factor. Regardless, it is known from contemporary accounts that the .45 and the 00 buckshot shotgun shell were things the soldiers considered essential to the confidence that they could stop a charging, determined Moro. It is also from the impact of the Juramentado that Gen. John J. Pershing acquired his respect for the shotgun as a military implement, which Americans would be the only force to carry in numbers into the First World War.

The juramentado suicide charges were started by the Moros in the late 19th century to compensate after 1876 when they suffered reprisals from modern gunboats run by steam used by the Spanish.

Path to paradise

Candidates, known as mag-sabil, "who endure the pangs of death," were selected from Muslim youth inspired to martyrdom by the teaching of Imams. Parents were consulted before the young men were permitted by the sultan to undergo training and preparation for Parang-sabil (the path to Paradise). After an oath taken, hand on the Qur'an, the chosen took a ritual bath, all body hair was shaved, and the eyebrows trimmed to resemble "a moon two days old." A strong band was wrapped firmly around the waist, and cords wrapped tightly around the genitals, ankles, knees, upper thighs, wrists, elbows, and shoulders, restricting blood flow and preventing the mag-sabil from losing too much blood from injury before reaching their target. Clad in white robe and turban, the chosen youth would polish and sharpen his weapons before action.

At the moment of attack, the mag-sabil in Tausug would approach a large group of enemies, shout the tahlil, draw kris or barong and then rush into the group swinging his sword, killing and maiming as many victims as possible in the time he had left. The mag-sabil's body would be washed and again wrapped in white for burial. In the unlikely event the mag-sabil survived his attack, it was believed his body would ascend to Paradise after 40 years had passed.

Response to the threat

The Moros' use of local intelligence to mark target situations, coupled with a keen understanding of the tactical element of surprise made combating juramentado warriors difficult for Spanish troops during its long attempt to occupy the Sulu Archipelago. In an era of warfare where body armor had become anachronistic, an unexpected melee attack with razor-sharp blades was a devastating tactic against veteran soldiers. Even when colonizers had time to draw weapons and fire on the charging attacker, the small caliber weapons commonly in use possessed no stopping power, bullets passing through limbs and torso, the juramentados' ritual binding working as a set of tourniquets to prevent the swordsman from bleeding out from wounds before accomplishing his purpose.

In 1983, the American journalist Daniel P. Mannix released an edited version of the autobiography of his father, Rear Admiral Daniel P Mannix the 3rd. The book, called The Old Navy: The Glorious Heritage of the U.S. Navy, Recounted through the Journals of an American Patriot, included the following paragraph: "What finally stopped the Juramentados was the custom of wrapping the dead man in a pig's skin and stuffing his mouth with pork. As the pig was an unclean animal, this was considered an unspeakable defilement."

Vic Hurley, an American author who was a member of the Philippine Constabulary, wrote the book Jungle Patrol in 1938, arguing that Colonel Alexander Rodgers of the 6th Cavalry Regiment (brother of Thomas S. Rodgers) had implemented the strategy of mass graves and pig entrails:

After the September 11 attacks on the United States, a number of American urban legends began circulating that John J. Pershing had ordered the summary execution of captured enemies using bullets laced with pig blood, and whose bodies were placed in a mass grave filled with pig entrails. Dr. Frank E. Vandiver, professor of history at Texas A&M University and author of Black Jack: The Life and Times of John J. Pershing said about the burial of Juramentados with pig remains that he never found any indication that it was true in extensive research on his Moro experiences, and that such an event would be out of keeping with Pershing's character. Rather, most sources indicate the idea of using pigs was suggested to Pershing but he rejected it.

Yet John Pershing did not say that he had ordered the practice, but that "the army had already adopted" the practice, and that "it was not pleasant", as he states quite clearly in his Memoir:

In the 2013 publishing of his Memoir, a footnote cites a letter from Maj. Gen. J. Franklin Bell to J. Pershing:

Similar practices
Muslim Acehnese from the Aceh Sultanate performed suicide attacks known as in the Acehnese language Prang sabi against Dutch invaders during the Aceh War. It was considered as part of personal jihad in the Islamic religion of the Acehnese. The Dutch called it Atjèh-moord, (Acehmord, Aceh mord, Aceh-mord) or (Aceh Pungo). Acehnese works of literature called hikayat prang sabi provided the background and reasoning for prang sabi. The Indonesian translations of the Dutch terms are Aceh bodoh (Aceh pungo) or Aceh gila (Aceh mord).

Prang sabi was also used against the Japanese by the Acehnese during the Japanese occupation of Aceh. The Acehnese ulama fought against both the Dutch and the Japanese, revolting against the Dutch in February 1942 and against Japan in November 1942. The revolt was led by the All-Aceh Religious Scholars' Association (PUSA). The Japanese suffered 18 dead in the uprising while they slaughtered up to 100 or over 120 Acehnese. The revolt happened in Bayu and was centred around Tjot Plieng village's religious school. During the revolt, the Japanese troops armed with mortars and machine guns were charged by sword wielding Acehnese under Teungku Abduldjalil (Tengku Abdul Djalil) in Buloh Gampong Teungah and Tjot Plieng on November 10 and 13. In May 1945 the Acehnese rebelled again.

The original jawi alphabet hikayat prang sabi (w:ace:Hikayat Prang Sabi, w:id:Hikayat Prang Sabi) has been transliterated into the Latin alphabet and annotated by Ibrahim Alfian published in Jakarta. Perang sabi was the Acehnese word for jihad, a holy war and Acehnese language literary works on prang sabi were distributed by ulama such as Teungku di Tiro to help the resistance against the Dutch in the Aceh War. The recompense awarded by in paradise detailed in Islamic Arabic texts and Dutch atrocities were expounded on in the hikayat prang sabi which was communally read by small cabals of ulama and Acehnese who swore an oath before going to achieve the desired status of "martyr" by launching suicide attacks on the Dutch. Perang sabil was the Malay equivalent to other terms like Jihad, Ghazawat for "Holy war", the text was also spelled "Hikayat perang sabi". Fiction novels like Sayf Muhammad Isa's Sabil: Prahara di Bumi Rencong on the war by Aceh against the Dutch include references to hikayat prang sabi. 	Mualimbunsu Syam Muhammad wrote the work called "Motives for Perang Sabil in Nusantara", Motivasi perang sabil di Nusantara: kajian kitab Ramalan Joyoboyo, Dalailul-Khairat, dan Hikayat Perang Sabil on Indonesia's history of Islamic holy war (Jihad). Children and women were inspired to do suicide attacks by the Hikayat Perang Sabil against the Dutch. Hikayat prang sabi is considered as part of 19th century Acehnese literature.

In Dutch occupied Aceh, hikayat prang sabi was confiscated from Sabi's house during a Police raid on September 27, 1917.

See also 
 Maharlika
Timawa
Pintados
Filipino martial arts
Bolo knife
Banzai charge
Suicide by cop

References

Further reading

History of the Philippines (1898–1946)
Culture-bound syndromes
Guerrilla warfare tactics
Jihad
Moro Rebellion
Muslim martyrs
Philippine–American War
Terrorism tactics
Moro conflict